The Pimp & da Gangsta is the second studio album by rap group Dirty, and their first released through a major label. It was released on February 27, 2001 through Universal Records and was produced by the members of group. The album peaked at #88 on the Billboard 200 and #19 on the Top R&B/Hip-Hop Albums.

Track listing

Charts

Weekly charts

Year-end charts

References

2001 albums
Dirty (group) albums